Khakineh or Khaginah or Khaginakh or Khagineh may refer to:

Khakineh-ye Bala
Khakineh-ye Pain